Peter Rhoades-Brown (born 2 January 1962 in Hampton, London) is an English retired footballer.

Rhoades-Brown played as a left-winger for Chelsea from 1979 to 1983; during his four years with Chelsea, he scored four League goals. When Chelsea signed winger Mickey Thomas in January 1984, Rhoades-Brown was sold to Oxford United for £85,000.

He immediately gained a regular place with Oxford, but the problem of accommodating Kevin Brock saw Rhoades-Brown become less of a permanent feature in the Second Division Championship side. An untimely injury, coincidentally against Queen's Park Rangers (Oxford's Wembley opponents), prevented him from playing in the 1986 League Cup Final. He stayed with Oxford until 1989 when injury forced his retirement, his last game being at Bristol City on 11 October 1989. In total he played 87 League matches for Oxford (plus 25 substitute appearances), scoring 13 goals. In competitive games, he played 113 times (plus 29 as a substitute), scoring 16 goals. He remains at Oxford United where he works as Business Development Manager for the club.

A testimonial match between an Oxford United XI and a Chelsea XI was held for him at the Kassam Stadium on 30 April 2007 in front of a crowd of 5,130. Among the players who appeared in the match were Rhoades-Brown's former Oxford teammates Ray Houghton, Joey Beauchamp and ex-England manager Steve McClaren.

Notes

1962 births
Living people
Chelsea F.C. players
English footballers
Oxford United F.C. players
People from Hampton, London
Footballers from the London Borough of Richmond upon Thames
Marlow F.C. players
Wycombe Wanderers F.C. players
Oxford City F.C. players
English Football League players
Association football wingers
Marlow F.C. managers
Oxford United F.C. non-playing staff
English football managers